Allram is a surname. Notable people with the surname include:

 Elisabeth Adele Allram-Lechner (1824–1861), Bohemian stage actress
 Josef Allram (1860–1941), Austrian writer and teacher

See also
 Allam

German-language surnames